Yoana Peralta Fernández (born 1999) is a Canadian-born Dominican footballer who plays as a midfielder for Icelandic club Ungmennafélagið Einherji and the Dominican Republic women's national team.

Early life
Peralta was raised in Toronto, Ontario, Canada. Her father is Dominican and her mother is Uruguayan. She attended the Father Henry Carr Catholic Secondary School.

College career
Peralta attended the York University and the Seneca College in her hometown.

International career
Peralta made her senior debut for the Dominican Republic on 30 October 2021.

References

External links

1999 births
Living people
Citizens of the Dominican Republic through descent
Dominican Republic women's footballers
Women's association football midfielders
Einherji players
Dominican Republic women's international footballers
Dominican Republic expatriate women's footballers
Expatriate women's footballers in Iceland
Dominican Republic people of Uruguayan descent
Sportspeople of Uruguayan descent
Soccer players from Toronto
Canadian women's soccer players
York Lions soccer players
Seneca College alumni
Canadian expatriate women's soccer players
Canadian expatriate sportspeople in Iceland
Canadian people of Dominican Republic descent
Canadian people of Uruguayan descent